Jayabhimadeva was the fourth king of Nepal after Arideva Malla, in which period the Malla dynasty was prominent. He succeeded Jayadeva Malla and reigned from 1258 to 1271.

Early life 
Jayabhimadeva, while not belonging to the Malla dynasty, was closely related with the same. He was a local lord in Banepa (then called Bhonta) and had started gathering political powers during the reigns of Abhaya Malla, and Jayadeva Malla. He, along with Jayasimha Malla of Bhadgaon, controlled much of the places in the valley and had greatly reduced the powers of the presiding monarch.

Conflicts 
In 1256, Jayabhimadeva recovered a village called Nipikvath. In the same year, he entered the state treasury and looted it with the help of the House of Tripura, and the officials of Patan. During a revolt, he was expelled from the kingdom but he seems to not have followed the royal orders.

Reign 
Jayadeva Malla, the last king from the lineage of Aridev Malla, died in 1258. Following his death, Jayabhimadeva and Jayasimha Malla of Tripura House met at Palanchok and came to an agreement to alternate the throne. Jaybhimadeva then started to reign on Nepal. The period of his reign are not very well known. He was succeeded by Jayasimha Malla in 1271 following the prior agreement.

References

Citations

Bibliography 

 
 

Malla rulers of the Kathmandu Valley
13th-century Nepalese people
Nepalese monarchs
History of Nepal